25th Anniversary Ultimate Best -The One- is a two-disc compilation album released by Luna Sea on May 28, 2014. All tracks were remastered from their original versions. Tracks 1.2, 2.6 and 2.8 are from their 2011 self-cover album, and track 1.14 is the re-recording from 2000's Period -the Best Selection- compilation. The release was also bundled with Never Sold Out 2 as a "2 in 1 Box" set.

Track listing

References 

Luna Sea albums
2014 compilation albums